Thawi Watthana may refer to:

 Thawi Watthana district in Bangkok, Thailand
Thawi Watthana subdistrict, Bangkok, in the district
Thawi Watthana subdistrict, Nonthaburi
 Khlong Thawi Watthana, a canal which runs through the area